
Gmina Morąg is an urban-rural gmina (administrative district) in Ostróda County, Warmian-Masurian Voivodeship, in northern Poland.

Villages
Apart from the town of Morąg, Gmina Morąg contains the villages and settlements of: 
 
 Anin
 Antoniewo
 Bartężek
 Białka
 Bogaczewo
 Borzymowo
 Bożęcin
 Bramka
 Chojnik
 Dobrocinek
 Dury
 Dworek
 Gubity
 Gulbity
 Jędrychówko
 Jurecki Młyn
 Jurki
 Kadzianka
 Kamionka
 Kępa Kalnicka
 Kretowiny
 Królewo
 Kruszewnia
 Kudypy
 Łączno
 Lubin
 Lusajny Małe
 Maliniak
 Markowo
 Morzewko
 Niebrzydowo Małe
 Niebrzydowo Wielkie
 Nowy Dwór
 Obuchowo
 Piłąg
 Plebania Wólka
 Prętki
 Prośno
 Raj
 Rogowo
 Rolnowo
 Ruś
 Silin
 Słonecznik
 Stabuniki
 Strużyna
 Szczuplinki
 Szymanowo
 Tątławki
 Wenecja
 Wilnowo
 Wola Kudypska
 Worytki
 Woryty Morąskie
 Żabi Róg
 Zawroty
 Zbożne
 Złotna
 Zwierzyniec

Neighbouring gminas
Gmina Morąg is bordered by the gminas of Godkowo, Łukta, Małdyty, Miłakowo, Miłomłyn, Pasłęk and Świątki.

References
Polish official population figures 2006

Morag
Ostróda County